Rosenman & Colin LLP was a New York City-based law firm that practiced from 1912 to 2002, at which point the firm merged with Chicago-based Katten Muchin Zavis to form Katten Muchin Rosenman. The firm previously practiced under the name Rosenman, Colin, Freund, Lewis & Cohen. 

Rosenman & Colin numbered some 275 attorneys when it merged with Katten Muchin Zavis in 2002, with offices in New York, Washington, DC, and Charlotte, North Carolina. Rosenman & Colin was well known for its estate and trust planning and administration, real estate, intellectual property and litigation practices. These practice areas have been influential in all aspects of New York City's legal arenas over the years.

Notable alumni
Marc Stuart Dreier – former New York litigator and convicted Ponzi scheme swindler
Clive Davis – music mogul
Michel Rosenfeld – professor at Benjamin N. Cardozo School of Law
Charles J. O'Byrne – Secretary to the Governor of the State of New York
Maria Echaveste – Senior adviser to President Bill Clinton
David G. Greenfield – NYC Councilman
Samuel I. Rosenman – Founder
William Golub – lawyer and advisor to Nelson Rockefeller

References

External links
Personal Injury Lawyers
Criminal Defense Attorneys

Defunct law firms of the United States
Defunct companies based in New York (state)
Law firms based in New York City
Law firms established in 1912
1912 establishments in New York City
Law firms disestablished in 2002
2002 disestablishments in New York (state)